Darragh Fanning (born 16 July 1986) is a rugby union player from Ireland. His preferred position is on the wing. Fanning currently plays for Irish provincial team Leinster Rugby in the Pro14. Fanning's father, Declan, is also a former Leinster senior player as well as captaining St. Mary's and Ireland 'B'.

During his stint with Connacht, Fanning made eight appearances, playing in the league and the Challenge Cup. He was also part of the Connacht team to play against . Fanning returned to his club St Mary's College, where he was named as captain for the 2013–14 season before being called up to the Leinster senior squad. He made his senior debut for Leinster on 9 September 2013 against the Welsh side Scarlets in the 2013–14 Pro12.

References

1986 births
Living people
Irish rugby union players
St Mary's College RFC players
Leinster Rugby players
People educated at St Mary's College, Dublin
Rugby union wings
Rugby union players from Dublin (city)